The women's 100 metres hurdles at the 1980 Summer Olympics in Moscow, Soviet Union had an entry list of 22 competitors, with three qualifying heats (22 runners), two semi-finals (16) before the final (8) took place on Monday 28 July 1980.

Final

Semi finals
Held on Monday 28 July 1980

Heats
Held on Sunday 27 July 1980

See also
 1976 Women's Olympic 100m Hurdles (Montreal)
 1978 European Championships 100m Hurdles (Prague)
 1982 European Championships 100m Hurdles (Athens)
 1983 Women's World Championships 100m Hurdles (Helsinki)
 1984 Women's Olympic 100m Hurdles (Los Angeles)

References

 1
Sprint hurdles at the Olympics
1980 in women's athletics
Women's events at the 1980 Summer Olympics